Franthiesco Anthonio Ballerini Manso (born, February 21, 1981), is a Brazilian journalist, art critic who is specialized in cinema, a writer, professor and PhD student in communication. He was the coordinator of free courses at Academia Internacional de Cinema in São Paulo, and is a member of the Associação Brasileira de Críticos de Arte. In 2015 he started researching about the power of culture in the world, with an emphasis on artistic productions and audiovisual entertainment in the 21st century.

Career
For eight years he was a journalist at Estadão, where he worked as a critic and international correspondent. From 2016 to 2019 he was a columnist at the Observatório da Imprensa, where he wrote regularly about themes related to the coverage of the arts. Since  2020, he has been writing about cultural soft power for the American independent media group, Fair Observer.

In Brazil, as a writer, he was a pioneer in dedicating exclusive publications about Indian cinema and soft power as a persuasive tool in arts and entertainment. He published 5 books since 2009, all about arts, cinema and arts journalism. His fourth book, Poder Suave – Soft Power was a finalist for the 60th Prêmio Jabuti in the creative economy category. In 2016, his article ‘Is Cinema a cultural bridge between Brazil and India?’ was published in the foreign language book Sur South – Poetics and Politics of Thinking Latin America / India, which is part of the Iberoamerican Library in Berlin, considered the greatest European library of Latin-American publications.

In cinema, he has worked as a producer, director and screenwriter, in fiction and documentaries, short and medium length films. He produced Legacy, part of the 2nd edition of ‘Films of City Frames’, invited by the Italian company Armani, exhibited during London Film Festival in 2015. In that same year, he wrote and directed the short Name, about journalistic vanity. The short was part of the official selection of Brazilian and international film festivals.

As film critic, he has contributed to the most important Brazilian media groups and he was also jury in competitive film festivals around Brazil.

Bibliography

Filmography

See also 
 Joseph Nye

References

External links
 
 
 

1981 births
Living people
People from Lorena, São Paulo
Brazilian journalists
Brazilian male writers
Brazilian film critics
Brazilian filmmakers
Brazilian educators
20th-century Brazilian writers
20th-century Brazilian educators